Igor is a common East Slavic given name derived from the Norse name Ingvar, that was brought to ancient Rus' by the Norse Varangians, in the form Ingvar or Yngvar.  Igor, the son of the Varangian chief Rurik, was left with Rurik's distant relative, first Grand Prince of Kiev Oleg, as a child. Igor after the death of Oleg replaced him on Kiev's throne. Outside of the Slavic language sphere, the name has also become common in Brazil and Portugal, and in the Basque-speaking part of Spain.

People

Igor
Igor of Kiev, ruler of Kievan Rus' from 913 to 945
Igor II of Kiev (died 1147), Grand Prince of Kiev (1146)
Igor the Assassin, name given to one of the alleged assassins of Alexander Litvinenko
Igor Akinfeev (born 1986), Russian football goalkeeper
Igor Andreev (born 1983), Russian tennis player
Igor Angulo (born 1984), Basque-Spanish footballer
Igor Antón (born 1983), Basque-Spanish cyclist
Igor Arnáez (born 1991), Basque-Spanish footballer
Igor Astarloa (born 1976), Basque-Spanish cyclist
Igor Belousov (1928–2005), Soviet statesman
Igor Bobček (born 1983), Slovak ice hockey defenceman
Igor Bogdanoff (1949–2022), French science fiction author
Igor Boki (born 1994), Belarusian Paralympic swimmer
Igor Cavalera (born 1970), Brazilian musician
Igor Chernykh (1932–2020), Russian camera operator
Prince Igor Constantinovich of Russia (1894–1918), Russian royalty
Igor Chugainov (born 1970), Russian football player and coach
Igor Danchenko (born 1978), Russian-American analyst
Igor M. Diakonoff (1915–1999), Russian historian, linguist, and translator
Igor Dodon (born 1975), Moldovan politician and president of Moldova from 2016 to 2020
Igor de Camargo (born 1983), Brazilian / Belgian footballer
Igor Gabilondo (born 1979), Basque-Spanish footballer
Igor Gaydamaka, Soviet sprint canoer
Igor Girkin (born 1970), Russian army artillery veteran
Igor Golomstock (1929–2017), London-based Russian art historian 
Igor González de Galdeano (born 1973), Basque-Spanish cyclist
Igor Julio dos Santos de Paulo (born 1998), Brazilian footballer
Igor Jankowski (born 1983), Belarusian-Polish composer
Igor Kholmanskikh (born 1969), Russian government appointee and former factory worker
Igor Kokoškov (born 1971), Serbian basketball coach
Igor Kunitsyn (born 1981), Russian tennis player
Igor Kurnosov (1985–2013), Russian chess grandmaster
Igor Larionov (born 1960), Soviet and Russian retired ice hockey player
Igor Lewczuk (born 1985), Polish football defender
Igor López de Munain (1983/1984–2022), Basque politician
Igor Luzhkovsky (1938–2000), Russian swimmer
Igor Markevitch (1912-1983), 20th-century Ukrainian-born composer and conductor
Igor Martinez (born 1989), Basque-Spanish footballer
Igor Matovič (born 1973), Slovak politician
Igor Medved (born 1981), Slovenian ski jumper
Igor Menshchikov (born 1970), Russian football player and coach
Igor Merino (born 1990), Basque-Spanish cyclist
Igor V. Minin (born 1960), Russian physicist
Igor Nesterenko (born 1990), Israeli-Ukrainian basketball player in the Israel Basketball Premier League
Igor Nikitin (ice hockey) (1966–2013), Russian ice hockey player
Igor Oistrakh (born 1931), Ukrainian violinist
Igor Olshanetskyi (born 1986), Israeli Olympic weightlifter
Igor Olshansky (born 1982), Ukrainian-born American National Football League player
Igor Omura Fraga (born 1998), Japanese-born Brazilian racing driver and eSports racer
Igor Pavlov (athlete) (born 1979), Russian pole vaulter
Igor Rasko (born 1966), Russian ice hockey player
Igor Savitsky (1915–1984), Russian art collector and art museum director.
Igor Sechin (born 1960), Russian businessman and politician
Igor Severyanin (1887–1941), Russian poet
Igor Shesterkin (born 1995), Russian ice hockey player 
Igor Shuvalov (born 1967), Russian politician
Igor Sijsling (born 1987), Dutch tennis player
Igor Sikorsky (1889–1972), Russian-born American pioneer of aviation in both helicopters and fixed-wing aircraft
Igor Smirnov (politician) (born 1941), Transnistrian politician
Igor Stravinsky (1882–1971), Russian-born composer of Ukrainian descent 
Igor Subbotin (born 1990), Estonian footballer
Igor Svyatoslavich (1151–1201/1202), Ukrainian prince
Igor Sypniewski (1974–2022), Polish football forward
Igor Śmiałowski (1917–2006), Polish actor
Igor Tudor (born 1978), Croatian footballer and manager
Igor Ursov (1927–2002) Russian phthisiatrist, scientist
Igor Yebra (born 1974), Basque-Spanish dancer
Igor Zubeldia (born 1997), Basque-Spanish footballer

Ihor
Ihor Bazhan (born 1981), Ukrainian footballer
Ihor Chuchman (born 1985), Kazakhstani footballer 
Ihor Della-Rossa (born 1939), Ukrainian racewalker
Ihor Huz (born 1982), Ukrainian politician, member of Parliament
Ihor Kalynets (b. 1939), Ukrainian poet and dissident during Soviet times
Ihor Kharatin (born 1995), Ukrainian footballer
Ihor Kharchenko (born 1962), Ukrainian diplomat
Ihor Kirienko (born 1986), Ukrainian footballer
Ihor Kohut (born 1996), Ukrainian footballer
Ihor Kolykhaiev (born 1971), Ukrainian politician and entrepreneur
Ihor Kolomoyskyi (born 1963), Ukrainian businessman
Ihor Kononenko (born 1965) Ukrainian businessman and politician
Ihor Kyrylenko (born 1991), Ukrainian singer, songwriter, producer and DJ, member in a number of musical bands
Ihor Kyryukhantsev (born 1996), Ukrainian footballer
Ihor Lytovchenko (born 1966), Ukrainian businessman and entrepreneur 
Ihor Lutsenko (politician) (born 1978), Ukrainian journalist and politician
Igor Melnik (born 1997), Russian footballer
Ihor Melnyk (footballer, born 1983), Ukrainian footballer
Ihor Melnyk (footballer, born 1986), Ukrainian footballer
Ihor Nasalyk (born 1962), Ukrainian optoelectronic engineer and politician
Ihor Olefirenko (born 1990), Ukrainian long distance runner
Ihor Pavlyuk (born 1967), Ukrainian writer, translator and research worker
Ihor Plastun (born 1990), Ukrainian footballer 
Ihor Podolchak (born 1962), Ukrainian film director and visual artist
Ihor Prokopchuk (born 1968), Ukrainian diplomat
Ihor Rainin or Raynin (born 1973), Ukrainian politician
Ihor Reptyukh (born 1994), Ukrainian cross-country skier and biathlete
Ihor Rybak (1934–2005), Ukrainian weightlifter
Ihor Reznichenko (born 1994), Ukrainian figure skater
Ihor Sahach (born 1956), Ukrainian diplomat
Ihor Shcherbak (1943-2002), Soviet long-distance runner
Ihor Shevchenko (born 1971), Ukrainian politician, government minister, and lawyer
Ihor Ševčenko (1922–2009), Polish-born philologist and historian of Ukrainian origin
Ihor Sorkin (born 1967), Ukrainian banker, chairman of the National Bank of Ukraine
Ihor Surkis (born 1958), Ukrainian businessman
Ihor Tsvietov (born 1994), Ukrainian Paralympic athlete with cerebral palsy
Ihor Tyschenko (born 1989), Ukrainian footballer
Ihor Yukhnovskyi (born 1925), Ukrainian physicist and politician, and a member of the Presidium
Ihor Yushko (born 1961), Ukrainian economist and politician
Ihor Zubko (born 1991), Ukrainian footballer

Ihar
Ihar Hermianchuk (1961–2002), Belarusian journalist and political activist.
Ihar Hershankou (1981—2018), convicted Belarusian murderer and fraudster
Ihar Makarau (born 1979), Belarusian judoka
Ihar Maystrenka (born 1959), Belarusian former rower
Ihar Razhkow (born 1981), Belarusian footballer
Ihar Rynkevich (born 1968), Belarusian legal and political expert, journalist and human rights activist
Ihar Stasevich (born 1985), Belarusian footballer
Ihar Tarlowski (born 1974), Belarusian footballer and coach
Ihar Truhaw (born 1976), Belarusian footballer and coach
Ihar Tsaplyuk (born 1970), Belarusian footballer
Ihar Zyankovich (born 1987), Belarusian footballer
Ihar Zyulew (born 1984), Belarusian footballer and coach

See also
Yegor

References

Slavic masculine given names